Mahamadou Souleymane (born c. 16 August 1984 or 1986), known professionally as Mdou Moctar (also M.dou Mouktar), is a Tuareg songwriter and musician based in Agadez, Niger, who performs modern rock music inspired by Tuareg guitar music. His music first gained attention through a trading network of mobile phones and memory cards in West Africa. He sings in the Tamasheq language. Moctar's fourth album, Ilana: The Creator, released in 2019, was the first to feature a full band. He plays guitar in the takamba and assouf styles.

Biography

Mdou Moctar was born in the Nigerien village of Tchintabaraden, and then grew up in Arlit, a mining town. After listening to artists such as Abdallah Oumbadougou he wanted to play the guitar, but his family disapproved of electric music, so he had to build his own guitar using bicycle cables for strings.

His first album, Anar, was recorded in Sokoto, Nigeria, in 2008 and prominently featured autotuned vocals and influences from Hausa music. The album was not officially released at the time but the songs became popular across the Sahel when they went viral through mobile phone music trading networks. Many of Moctar's initial songs were shared as MP3 files person-to-person throughout Niger via Bluetooth without his involvement.

Some of the songs reached a global audience when Sahel Sounds released them on the Music from Saharan Cellphones: Volume 1 compilation. Two songs were covered with English homophone lyrics by Everclear, an American band from Portland, Oregon. Anar was released on vinyl in 2014 with a high price, due to "predatory business practices" from Sixt on Moctar's first European tour.

His next album, Afelan, was recorded live in Tchintabaraden and features "rusty-edged jams and sun-weathered ballads". The title track is named after a celebrated historical/folkloric hero of the Azawough of Western Niger. It contains a cover of "Chet Boghassa" by Tinariwen. Moctar became aware of international interest in his music in 2014: 

Moctar released his fifth studio album Ilana (The Creator) in 2019; it was his first studio album recorded with a full band. NPR's Bob Boilen named the album "perhaps the most fiery psych-rock of the 21st century" while Happy Mag placed it at no.13 on their list of "The 25 best psychedelic rock albums of the 2010s", labelling it "serious music for a serious cause." Moctar's sixth album, Afrique Victime, was released via Matador Records on 21 May 2021. The album received positive reviews from international publications including Rolling Stone, Paste, Pitchfork, and The Guardian.

International tours 
During February and March of 2022, Mdou Moctar was touring with sixteen dates as the opening act for Brooklyn-based indie rock band Parquet Courts' North American Tour. Moctar also had eight headlining shows added to the beginning and end of this tour, which would be followed up by headlining a spring 2022 European tour.
The Irish leg of the tour was cancelled due to visa issues.

Films
Moctar appeared in the short film I Sing the Desert Electric in 2013. He also had the starring role in the 2015 film Akounak Tedalat Taha Tazoughai (Rain the Color of Blue with a Little Red In It). The soundtrack features music performed on set and at L'Embobineuse. In 2022, Moctar appeared in a Fender Sessions video and performed three songs from their album Afrique Victime, including the title track "Afrique Victime", "Ya Habibti" and "Chismiten". Moctar recorded an NPR Tiny Desk Concert, recorded in the winter of 2020 from a home in Niamey, Niger and released on NPR's website on 24 May 2021.

Band members 
Adapted from album liner notes.

 Mahamadou "Mdou Moctar" Souleymane – lead guitar, vocals
 Ahmoudou Madassane – rhythm guitar, backing vocals
 Michael "Mikey" Coltun – bass guitar, backing vocals, drum machines; producer (2017–present)
 Souleymane Ibrahim – drums, percussion, backing vocals (2019–present)

Former members

 Aboubacar Mazawadje Ibrahim – drums (c. 2018)
 Mahmoud "Achcouscous" Ahmed Jabre – drums (c. 2016–2017)

Discography

Studio albums
Anar (2008; reissued 2014 by Sahel Sounds)
Akounak Tedalat Taha Tazoughai (original soundtrack) (Sahel Sounds, 2015)
Sousoume Tamachek (Sahel Sounds, 2017)
Ilana: The Creator (Sahel Sounds, 2019)
Afrique Victime (Matador Records, 2021)

Live albums
Afelan (Sahel Sounds, 2013)
Blue Stage Sessions (Third Man Records, 2019)

Singles and EPs
Tahoultine (2011)
Anar / Vanessa (Sahel Sounds, 2012) (split with Brainstorm)
Ibitlan / Tiknass (Sunbone) (Sahel Sounds, 2020)
Niger EP Vol. 1 (Matador Records, 2022)
Niger EP Vol. 2 (Matador Records, 2022)

Compilation appearances
Music from Saharan Cellphones: Volume 1 (2010) 
Music for Saharan Cellphones: The International Reworks (2011)
The Mdou Moctar Covers (2012) (split with Brainstorm)
Pop Music from Republique Du Niger (2012)
Music from Saharan Cellphones: Volume 2 (2013)
Ronald Paris / Mdou Moctar (2014) (split cassette with Porches)
Rough Trade Shops Africa 13 (2014)
Mind the Gap #110 (2014)
Below the Radar 10 (2014)
Afrique Refait (2022) (remix album of Afrique Victime featuring only African artists)

References

Berber Muslims
Berber Nigeriens
Nigerien desert blues musicians
Tuareg people
Nigerien Muslims
Living people
Matador Records artists
Berber musicians
Year of birth missing (living people)
21st-century guitarists
21st-century Nigerien male singers
Male guitarists
People from Tahoua Region
People from Agadez Region
Nigerien guitarists